Perinjankutti River is one of the major tributaries of the  Periyar River, the longest river in Kerala state of south India.

See also
 Periyar River - Main river

Other major tributaries of Periyar river
Muthirapuzha River
Mullayar 
Cheruthoni  
Edamalayar

Rivers of Kerala
Periyar (river)
Rivers of India